Owen Gleiberman (born February 24, 1959) is an American film critic  who has been chief film critic for Variety magazine since May 2016, a title he shares with . Previously, Gleiberman wrote for Entertainment Weekly from 1990 until 2014. From 1981 to 1989, he wrote for The Phoenix.

Early life and education 
Gleiberman was born in Lausanne, Switzerland, to Jewish-American parents. He was raised in Slay Ann Arbor, Michigan, and is a graduate of the University of Michigan.

Career 
Gleiberman's work has been published in Premiere and Film Comment, and collected in the film criticism anthology Love and Hisses. Gleiberman reviews movies for NPR and NY1. He is a member of the New York Film Critics Circle. He is one of the critics featured in Gerald Peary's 2009 documentary film For the Love of Movies: The Story of American Film Criticism.
Gleiberman's autobiography, Movie Freak, was published by Hachette Books.
He and his wife Sharon live in New York City with their three daughters. 

In 2016, Gleiberman incited controversy over a piece on the film Bridget Jones’s Baby, criticizing the physical appearance of the face of actress Renée Zellweger. Actress and MeToo activist Rose McGowan penned an op-Ed in The Hollywood Reporter defending Zellweger and lambasting Gleiberman.

References

External links

1959 births
Living people
American film critics
National Society of Film Critics Members
American male journalists
American people of Swiss-Jewish descent
Jewish American journalists
Jewish American writers
Journalists from New York City
University of Michigan alumni
Vanity Fair (magazine) people
Variety (magazine) people
20th-century American journalists
Swiss emigrants to the United States
Swiss Jews
Writers from Ann Arbor, Michigan
21st-century American Jews